David Hill (12 August 1915 – 1 June 1974) was a Guyanese cricketer. He played in ten first-class matches for British Guiana from 1937 to 1953.

See also
 List of Guyanese representative cricketers

References

External links
 

1915 births
1974 deaths
Guyanese cricketers
Guyana cricketers